"Harmony in My Head" is a song by Buzzcocks. It was released as a single in 1979, reaching number 32 in the UK Singles Chart. It was written and sung by Steve Diggle.
In a 2006 interview with Pitchfork Media, Diggle revealed he had smoked 20 cigarettes to achieve the gruff sound of the vocals. 

The song title was also used as the name of a radio show hosted by singer Henry Rollins on Indie 103.1, a Santa Monica, California FM radio station.  Rollins stated in Fanatic, his book about the radio show's first run that "Harmony in My Head" is his favorite Buzzcocks song; appropriately, the Buzzcocks' recording kicked off the first episode of the show. When Rollins relaunched the show after a short hiatus on 27 December 2005, he used a live recording of the same song.

Track listing
 "Harmony in My Head" (Diggle) – 3:06
 "Something's Gone Wrong Again" (Shelley) – 4:29

References

1979 singles
Buzzcocks songs
1979 songs